Carnitine O-acetyltransferase also called carnitine acetyltransferase (CRAT, or CAT)  is an enzyme that encoded by the CRAT gene that catalyzes the chemical reaction

acetyl-CoA + carnitine  CoA + acetylcarnitine

where the acetyl group displaces the hydrogen atom in the central hydroxyl group of carnitine.

Thus, the two substrates of this enzyme are acetyl-CoA and carnitine, whereas its two products are CoA and O-acetylcarnitine.  The reaction is highly reversible and does not depend on the order in which substrates bind.

Different subcellular localizations of the CRAT mRNAs are thought to result from alternative splicing of the CRAT gene suggested by the divergent sequences in the 5' region of peroxisomal and mitochondrial CRAT cDNAs and the location of an intron where the sequences diverge. The alternatively splicing of this gene results in three distinct isoforms, one of which contains an N-terminal mitochondrial transit peptide, and has been shown to be located in mitochondria.

Nomenclature 

This enzyme belongs to the family of transferases, to be specific those acyltransferases transferring groups other than aminoacyl groups.  The systematic name of this enzyme class is acetyl-CoA:carnitine O-acetyltransferase. Other names in common use include acetyl-CoA-carnitine O-acetyltransferase, acetylcarnitine transferase, carnitine acetyl coenzyme A transferase, carnitine acetylase, carnitine acetyltransferase, carnitine-acetyl-CoA transferase, and CATC.  This enzyme participates in alanine and aspartate metabolism.

Structure 

In general, carnitine acetyltransferases have molecular weights of about 70 kDa, and contain approximately 600 residues1. CRAT contains two domains, an N domain and a C domain, and is composed of 20 α helices and 16 β strands. The N domain consists of an eight-stranded β sheet flanked on both sides by eight α helices. A six-stranded mixed β sheet and eleven α helices comprise the enzyme’s C domain.

When compared, the cores of the two domains reflect significantly similar peptide backbone folding. This occurs despite the fact that only 4% of the amino acids that comprise those peptide backbones corresponds to one another.

Active site 

His343 is the catalytic residue in CRAT.  It is located at the interface between the enzyme’s C and N domains towards the heart of CRAT. His343 is accessible via two 15-18 Å channels that approach the residue from opposite ends of the CRAT enzyme. These channels are utilized by the substrates of CRAT, one channel for carnitine, and one for CoA. The side chain of His343 is positioned irregularly, with the δ1 ring nitrogen hydrogen bonded to the carbonyl oxygen on the amino acid backbone.

CoA binding site 

Due to the fact that CRAT binds CoA, rather than acetyl-CoA, it appears that CRAT possesses the ability to hydrolyze acetyl-CoA, before interacting with the lone CoA fragment at the binding site. CoA is bound in a linear conformation with its pantothenic arm binding at the active site. Here, the pantothenic arm’s terminal thiol group and the ε2 nitrogen on the catalytic His343 side chain form a hydrogen bond. The 3’-phosphate on CoA forms interactions with residues Lys419 and Lys423. Also at the binding site, the residues Asp430 and Glu453 form a direct hydrogen bond to one another. If either residue exhibits a mutation, can result in a decrease in CRAT activity.

Carnitine binding site 

Carnitine binds to CRAT in a partially folded state, with its hydroxyl group and carboxyl group facing opposite directions. The site itself is composed of the C domain β sheet and particular residues from the N domain. Upon binding, a face of carnitine is left exposed to the space outside the enzyme. Like CoA, carnitine forms a hydrogen bond with the ε2 nitrogen on His343. In the case of carnitine, the bond is formed with its 3-hydroxyl group. This CRAT catalysis is stereospecific for carnitine, as the stereoisomer of the 3-hydroxyl group cannot sufficiently interact with the CRAT carnitine binding site. CRAT undergoes minor conformational changes upon binding with carnitine.

Function

Enzyme mechanism

The His343 residue at the active site of CRAT acts as a base that is able to deprotonate the CoA thiol group or the Carnitine 3’-hydroxyl group depending on the direction of the reaction. The structure of CRAT optimizes this reaction by causing direct hydrogen bonding between the His343 and both substrates. The deprotonated group is now free to attack the acetyl group of acetyl-CoA or acetylcarnitine at its carbonyl site. The reaction proceeds directly, without the formation of a His343-acetyl intermediate.

Hydrolysis
It is possible for catalysis to occur with only one of the two substrates. If either acetyl-CoA or acetylcarnitine binds to CRAT, a water molecule may fill the other binding site and act as an acetyl group acceptor.

Substrate-assisted catalysis
The literature suggests that the trimethylammonium group on carnitine may be a crucial factor in CRAT catalysis. This group exhibits a positive charge that stabilizes the oxyanion in the reaction’s intermediate. This idea is supported by the fact the positive charge of carnitine is unnecessary for active site binding, but vital for the catalysis to proceed. This has been proven to be the case through the synthesis of a carnitine analog lacking its trimethylammonium group. This compound was able to compete with carnitine in binding to CRAT, but was unable to induce a reaction. The emergence of subtrate-assisted catalysis has opened up new strategies for increasing synthetic substrate specificity.

Biological function 

There is evidence that suggests that CRAT activity is necessary for the cell cycle to proceed from the G1 phase to the S phase.

Clinical significance 

Those with an inherited deficiency in CRAT activity are at risk for developing severe heart and neurological problems.

Reduced CRAT activity can be found in individuals suffering from Alzheimer’s disease.

CRAT and its family of enzymes have great potential as targets for developing therapeutic treatments for Type 2 diabetes and other diseases.

Interactions 

CRAT is known to interact with NEDD8, PEX5, SUMO1.

References

Further reading 

 
 
 

 AgRP Neurons Require Carnitine Acetyltransferase to Regulate Metabolic Flexibility and Peripheral Nutrient Partitioning
]

EC 2.3.1
Enzymes of known structure